Hjartdal Church is a parish church of the Church of Norway in Hjartdal Municipality in Vestfold og Telemark county, Norway. It is located in the village of Hjartdal. It is one of the churches in the Hjartdal parish which is part of the Øvre Telemark prosti (deanery) in the Diocese of Agder og Telemark. The white, wooden church was built in a cruciform design in 1812 using plans drawn up by the architect Jarand Aasmundson Rønjom. The church seats about 220 people.

History
The earliest existing historical records of the church date back to the year 1414, but the church was not new that year. This first church was known as the Holmskyrkja or Holm Church. The old church site was surrounded on three sides by the river Hjartdøla and the ground was so damp that the foundations rotted, and it was not enough to have stone slabs underneath. By the early 19th century, the centuries-old building was in very poor shape and the desire to repair the old church was minimal, so the parish decided to build a new church.

The new church was built further away from the river, but the cemetery down near the river is still used, and it is said that remains from the old church building can still be found there. The new church was designed by Jarand Rønjom along with the builder Halvor Høgkasin. The cruciform design had a choir in the eastern transept with a pulpit altar. Construction on the new church began in 1809, and the new building was consecrated on 12 July 1812. The old church was torn down afterwards.

In 1814, this church served as an election church. Together with more than 300 other parish churches across Norway, it was a polling station for elections to the 1814 Norwegian Constituent Assembly which wrote the Constitution of Norway. This was Norway's first national elections. Each church parish was a constituency that elected people called "electors" who later met together in each county to elect the representatives for the assembly that was to meet in Eidsvoll later that year.

The exterior of the church today bears the mark of changes carried out in 1888, when the style was changed to Neo-Gothic/Swiss, the top of the tower was changed, and the church got small extensions at the doors.

Media gallery

See also
List of churches in Agder og Telemark

References

Hjartdal
Churches in Vestfold og Telemark
Cruciform churches in Norway
Wooden churches in Norway
19th-century Church of Norway church buildings
Churches completed in 1812
13th-century establishments in Norway
Norwegian election church